"I Want You to Need Me" is a song recorded by Canadian singer Celine Dion for her 1999 greatest hits album, All the Way... A Decade of Song. It was written by Diane Warren and produced by Matt Serletic. "I Want You to Need Me" was released as the second single in North America and Japan in April 2000, and third single in selected European countries in July 2000. Several club remixes were created by Thunderpuss. The song received positive reviews from music critics and topped the Canadian Singles Chart. The music video was directed by Liz Friedlander.

Background and release
On 5 April 2000, "I Want You to Need Me" was released as the second single from All the Way... A Decade of Song in Japan. On 19 July 2000, another "I Want You to Need Me" single was issued there, this time with remixes by Thunderpuss. In the United States, the song impacted AC/Hot AC radio on 17 April 2000 and CHR/Pop radio on 25 April 2000. The physical single was released in the US as a double A-side with "That's the Way It Is" on 1 August 2000. "I Want You to Need Me" was also sent to radio in several European countries in June 2000, and was physically released there in July 2000.

Critical reception
Chuck Taylor reviewed "I Want You to Need Me" and wrote that linking Dion and Diane Warren has always been about "as fine a fit as a trusty pair of Thom McAn's." Between Warren's "heart-drenched" words and dramatic melody writing and Dion's "potent vocals straight from soulside, divadom has never sounded so mighty." According to him, for fans of Dion's "high-caliber" power ballads, this is truly among the best ever and a highlight on All the Way... A Decade of Song. Taylor stated that Warren's trusty melody is wholly natural and free-flowing, while production from the usually rock-oriented Matt Serletic is "sheer perfection. It all peaks from the glorious midsection through to the end, where Dion delivers exactly what we've come to expect: a crescendo as "spine-tingling" as those first few times we heard 'My Heart Will Go On.'" Michael Paoletta from Billboard wrote about this song "a consummate love song ripe for a second single". Stephen Thomas Erlewine of AllMusic said that "this song isn't bad it just isn't that particularly memorable, especially compared to the hits." Jose F. Promis reviewed the US CD maxi single and gave it 3 out 5 stars. He called the mixes "impassioned, high-NRG Thunderpuss remixes (...) which became something of an underground club hit. That song, in its original form, is a big bombastic ballad (and isn't on this disc), and is precisely the type of grand ballad that lends itself effortlessly to dancefloor transformation. However, the dance mixes can be a bit loud and a bit strident for those not into this sort of thing."

Commercial performance
"I Want You to Need Me" entered the Canadian Adult Contemporary chart in April 2000 and peaked at number 19. In late June 2000, it debuted at number one on the Canadian Singles Chart. The song also entered the US Adult Contemporary chart in April 2000, peaking at number 12. After being physically released, it debuted on the US Hot Dance Music/Maxi-Singles Sales and Hot Singles Sales charts in August 2000, reaching number 7 and 62, respectively. "I Want You to Need Me" also reached top 40 in Sweden and Switzerland.

Music video
The original music video was directed by Paul Hunter in February 2000, but it was never released. It had a story line where a girl, played by Angela Sarafyan, had a bad boyfriend and was rebelling against her mother. The song's second music video was directed by Liz Friedlander and released on 1 May 2000. It was included later on Dion's All the Way... A Decade of Song & Video DVD.

Formats and track listings

European CD single
"I Want You to Need Me" – 4:34
"I Want You to Need Me" (Thunderpuss Radio Mix) – 4:32

European CD maxi-single
"I Want You to Need Me" – 4:34
"I Want You to Need Me" (Thunderpuss Radio Mix) – 4:32
"I Want You to Need Me" (Thunderpuss Tribapella) – 7:41
"That's the Way It Is" (The Metro Club Remix) – 5:28

European 12-inch single
"I Want You to Need Me" (Thunderpuss Club Mix) – 8:09
"I Want You to Need Me" (Thunderpuss Tribapella) – 7:41
"I Want You to Need Me" (Thunderdub) – 6:45
"I Want You to Need Me" (Thunderpuss Club Instrumental) – 8:10

Japanese CD single
"I Want You to Need Me" – 4:34
"Then You Look at Me" – 4:09
"My Heart Will Go On" (Live) – 5:23

Japanese CD maxi-single
"I Want You to Need Me" (Thunderpuss Radio Mix) – 4:32
"I Want You to Need Me" (Thunderpuss Club Mix) – 8:10
"I Want You to Need Me" (Thunderpuss Tribapella) – 7:42
"I Want You to Need Me" (Thunderdub) – 6:43
"That's the Way It Is" (Metro Mix - Edit) – 3:15
"That's the Way It Is" (The Metro Club Remix) – 5:30

US CD and 12-inch single
"That's the Way It Is" (Album Version) – 4:01
"That's the Way It Is" (The Metro Club Remix) – 5:28
"I Want You to Need Me" (Thunderpuss Radio Mix) – 4:32
"I Want You to Need Me" (Thunderpuss Club Mix) – 8:09

Charts

Weekly charts

Year-end charts

Release history

References

External links
 

1990s ballads
1999 songs
2000 singles
550 Music singles
Canadian Singles Chart number-one singles
Celine Dion songs
Columbia Records singles
Music videos directed by Liz Friedlander
Pop ballads
Song recordings produced by Matt Serletic
Songs written by Diane Warren
Sony Music Entertainment Japan singles